This is a list of mayors of Greenville, South Carolina, a city in the northwest (Upstate) part of the U.S. state of South Carolina. Before the city's office of Mayor was established, a similar role was that of Intendant. Mayors began office when the General Assembly amended the town charter in February 1869 to establish Greenville as a city. Officials elected to multiple consecutive terms have the number of terms noted after their names.


Intendants

Mayors

References

Greenville